Choose may refer to:

 Choice, the act of judging the merits of multiple options and selecting one of them for action
 Combination, a mathematical function describing number of possible selections of subsets ('seven choose two')
 Morra, a hand game sometimes referred to as Choose
 Choose (film), a crime horror film directed by Marcus Graves
 "Choose" (Color Me Badd song), from the 1993 album Time and Chance
 "Choose", song by Stone Sour from the album Stone Sour
 "Choose", song by Why Don't We from the album 8 Letters
 "Choose", song performed by Matt Monro for the United Kingdom in the Eurovision Song Contest 1964

See also
 Pick (disambiguation)
 Take